Friedrich Wilhelm Zachow or Zachau (14 November 1663, Leipzig – 7 August 1712, Halle) was a German musician and composer of vocal and keyboard music.

Life
Zachow probably received his training from his father, the piper Heinrich Zachow, one of Leipzig's town musicians in the Alta capella, and maybe from Johann Schelle, a leading German composer, when the family moved to Eilenburg. As Kantor and organist of Halle's Market Church in 1684 he succeeded Samuel Ebart. During his time at Halle he became particularly renowned as a composer of dramatic cantatas. In 1695 he was criticized by the pietists because of his excessive long and elaborate music, that could be only appreciated by cantors and organists. Zachow was influenced by Johann Theile in Merseburg and the poetry of Erdmann Neumeister, pastor in the nearby Weissenfels, and his criticism on pietism.

Zachow was the teacher of Gottfried Kirchhoff, Johann Philipp Krieger and Johann Gotthilf Ziegler, but is best remembered as George Frideric Handel's first music teacher. He taught Handel how to play the violin, organ, harpsichord, and oboe as well as counterpoint. Zachow's teaching was so effective, that in 1702, Handel accepted a position as organist at the former Dom in Halle at age seventeen. It is said that after Zachow died in 1712, Handel became a benefactor to his widow and children in gratitude for his teacher's instruction. In 1713 J.S. Bach was invited as Zachow's successor.

Handel continued to use Zachow's compositions in his own works, not simply quoting, but also in terms of instrumental colour; for example the cantata Herr, wenn ich nur dich habe, which is unique in having a harp solo in the German cantata repertoire, was copied by Handel, taken to London, and may have influenced the instrumentation of Saul and Esther.

Selected works, editions and recordings
Mass – Missa super chorale Christ lag in Todesbanden (1701)
Approximately 24 cantatas survive: 
Chorus ille coelitum (1698)
Confitebor tibi Domine (1701)
Danksaget dem Vater (1702)
(see also recordings below)
Keyboard works: Toccata C-Dur, Präludium C-Dur, Präludium F-Dur, Fuge C-Dur, Two Fugues G-Dur, Fantasia D-Dur, Capriccio d-Moll, Suite h-Moll, several organ chorales
Trio F-Dur für Flauto traverso, Fagott und Basso continuo

Recordings
Christmas cantatas. Meine Seel: erhebt den Herren; Herr, wenn ich nur dich habe; Preiset mit mir den Herren; Lobe den Herrn, meine Seele Constanze Backes, Capella Frisiae & Accademia Amsterdam, dir. Ludger Remy. Quintone.nl 2010
Easter cantatas. Ich bin die Auferstehung und das Leben. Bei Gott ist mein Heil, meine Ehre. Ach Herr, mich armen Sünder (attributed to Handel but probably by Zachow) Osterdialog Triumph, ihr Christen seid erfreut. Gudrun Sidonie Otto, Margaret Hunter, Christoph Dittmar, Cantus Thuringia, Capella Thuringia, dir. Bernhard Klapprott CPO 2010
Suite in B for harpsichord. Carole Cerasi - J.S. Bach and the Möller Manuscript -  Metronome Recordings - METCD 1055

References

External links

Friedrich Wilhelm Zachow (Composer) bach-cantatas.com

1663 births
1712 deaths
German male classical composers
German Baroque composers
Organists and composers in the North German tradition
German male organists
German classical organists
Musicians from Leipzig
People from the Electorate of Saxony
18th-century keyboardists
18th-century classical composers
18th-century German male musicians
Male classical organists